Emy Koopman (born 1985) is a Dutch writer, journalist and presenter. She has written for De Groene Amsterdammer, de Volkskrant, de Correspondent and hard//hoofd.

Koopman studied literary studies and clinical psychology. In 2016, she obtained a PhD, with a dissertation on Literature and Empathy. That same year, her debut novel Orewoet was published and was nominated for The Bronze Owl for the best Dutch-language debut, and for the Fintro Literature Prize. In August 2020, her second novel Het Boek van Alle Angsten (The Book of All Fears) was published. Her third book, Tekenen van het Universum (Signs of the Universe) was released in February 2022.

In 2020, Koopman presented Paradise Canada, a five-part Dutch-Canadian documentary and travel series by public broadcaster VPRO. Topics and locations included social impacts of Homelessness in Vancouver, the industry of Athabasca oil sands and Fort McMurray, violence against women in light of the Toronto van attack and the cultural, national tragedy, affected markedly on indigenous women, of the Highway of Tears in British Columbia.

References

External links 
 Official Website 

Dutch journalists
Dutch writers
Dutch women writers
1985 births
Living people